Steleopteridae  is a family of extinct winged damselflies whose fossils have been found in  modern Germany, Great Britain and Kazakhstan, and which lived at the end of the Jurassic and the beginning of the Cretaceous (166.1–130.0 million years ago).

The family was described by the Austrian paleoentomologist Anton Handlirsch in 1906 on the basis of the fossilised exoskeleton Steleopteron deichmuelleri. Hence, the type genus is Steleopteron. Handlirsch assigned the family to the Epiproctophora. In 2001, the family was excluded from the Epiproctophora and transferred into a suborder of winged damselflies, Zygoptera.  Until 2018, it had been believed that Steleopteridae became extinct in the Jurassic, but the discovery of Steleopteron cretacicus showed
that the family may have become extinct as late as the Cretaceous.

They were fast flying insectivorous/carnivorous predators.

According to the Fossilworks Database website, as of November 2019, the family includes 5 extinct species:

Auliella crucigera Pritykina, 1968
 Euparasteleopteron viohli Fleck et al., 2001
 Parasteleopteron guischardi Fleck et al., 2001
Steleopteron cretacicus Zheng et al. 2018
Steleopteron deichmuelleri Handlirsch, 1906

References

Prehistoric insect families